Phillips Potato House is a historic potato house located near Laurel, Sussex County, Delaware. It one of the last surviving examples of its building type.  It was built about 1900, and is a two-story, balloon frame structure on a concrete foundation and with a gable roof. It measures 24 feet by 29 feet, and is sheathed in green asbestos shingles over original weatherboards.

It was placed on the National Register of Historic Places in 1990.

References

Agricultural buildings and structures on the National Register of Historic Places in Delaware
Commercial buildings completed in 1900
Buildings and structures in Sussex County, Delaware
Potato houses in Delaware
Laurel, Delaware
National Register of Historic Places in Sussex County, Delaware